The Suevia was a passenger steamship built for the Hamburg America Line in 1874. It was assigned to transatlantic crossings between Hamburg, Germany and New York City, USA and played a role in German immigration to the United States.

The Suevia had accommodation for 100 first-class, 70 second-class and 600 third-class passengers. It had two masts and reached a speed of 13 knots. In 1884 it got new steam boilers and served for the Hamburg America Line 10 more years until 1894. In 1896 it was sold to Schiaffino, Nyer & Siges in Algeria and renamed Quatre Amis. After it stranded near Antwerp in 1898 it was scrapped in Marseille.

Collision 

On 13 April 1889, during a dense fog, the Hamburg Line steamship Suevia ran into the pilot-boat Commodore Bateman, No. 11, and sank her off Georges Bank, Cape Cod. Pilot John Handran and the cook Henry Halford were drowned trying to escape the sinking boat. Others on the pilot-boat were saved and taken on board the Suevia.

See also
 Soren Sorensen Adams - a Danish-American inventor and manufacturer who immigrated to the United States on the Suevia in 1883.
 Carl Eytel – a German-American artist who immigrated to the United States aboard the Suevia in 1885.

References

Ships built on the River Clyde
Ships of the Hamburg America Line
1874 ships